The 1990–91 IHF Women's Cup Winners' Cup was the fifteenth edition of IHF's competition for European women's handball national cup champions.

Radnički Belgrade defeated 13-times European Cup champion Spartak Kyiv in the final to win its second Cup Winners' Cup, an overall fifth European trophy. This was the last edition where East Germany, one of the competition's powerhouses, was represented due to the reunification of Germany, signed few days after the preliminary round was played. Like in the previous season the ex-East and West German sides, SC Magdeburg and Buxtehuder SV, faced each other, with the latter winning this time.

Results

References

Women's EHF Cup Winners' Cup
1990 in handball
1991 in handball